Tenellia distans is a species of sea slug, an aeolid nudibranch, a marine gastropod mollusc in the family Fionidae.

Distribution
This species was described from the Varangerfjord, near Vadsø in Finnmark, Norway. However, this nudibranch has not been seen since it was first described by Odhner in 1922.

References 

Fionidae
Gastropods described in 1922